The Monroeville Downtown Historic District is a  historic district in downtown Monroeville, Alabama.  It is centered on the courthouse square and the streets that border it.  The streets include Claiborne Street on the south, Alabama Avenue on the east, Pineville Road on the north and Mount Pleasant Avenue on the west.  The district includes examples of the Classical Revival, American Craftsman, Moderne, and other residential and commercial architectural styles.  It contains 63 structures, with 51 of them listed as contributing buildings.  It was added to the National Register of Historic Places on September 16, 2009.

References

National Register of Historic Places in Monroe County, Alabama
Historic districts in Monroe County, Alabama
Historic districts on the National Register of Historic Places in Alabama